Ata ul Haq Qasmi (Punjabi) is a Pakistani Urdu-language newspaper columnist, playwright and poet. He has written around twenty books and many articles on different subjects for the leading newspapers of Pakistan.

Early life and career
Qasmi was born in Amritsar, Punjab, India in 1943. His family has Kashmiri roots. His father Maulana Baha ul Haq Qasmi used to teach at MAO High School and MAO College in Amritsar. After independence of Pakistan in 1947, his family migrated to Pakistan and first settled in Wazirabad and later moved to Lahore where he finished his high school. He then graduated from MAO College, Lahore. He first joined the Urdu language newspaper Nawa-i-Waqt as a sub-editor where the renowned journalist Majid Nizami was the editor. Later he started writing columns for Daily Jang and many other newspapers.

The most distinguished character of Qasmi's column is his satire on social inequalities of the society and his anti-dictatorship stance which he boldly takes in his columns. He has a unique style of writing compared to any other columnist due to the humorous way he handles even the serious issues in the country.
 
He served as the Ambassador of Pakistan in Norway and Thailand from 1997 to 1999. His books and newspaper columns include "Column Tamam", "Shar Goshiyan", "Hansna Rona Mana Hay", "Mazeed Ganjey Farishtey" and many more while his TV Drama Serials include the most popular PTV TV dramas Khawaja and Son (1988), "Shab Daig" and "Aap ka Khadim" popularly known by its character "Sheeda Taili". "Shab Daig" and "Sheeda Talli" were directed and produced by Mushtaque Choudhary.
His travelogues Shoq-e-Awargi and Goron kay des mein are widely read and popular among the readers. In early 2015, he was serving as the honorary Chairman of the Lahore Arts Council, Lahore, Pakistan.

Veteran Pakistani journalist Altaf Gauhar had once named him the wittiest newspaper columnist in Pakistan. The well-known writer Mushtaq Ahmad Yusufi has called him the best newspaper columnist in the country. He has been working as a journalist for 52 years.

In 2015, he was appointed Chairman for Pakistan Television Corporation, a state-owned institution, where he served till December 2017. He has been associated and involved with Pakistani television for over 35 years as a playwright.

Awards and recognition
 Pride of Performance Award by the President of Pakistan in 1991
 Sitara-i-Imtiaz (Star of Excellence) Award by the President of Pakistan
 Hilal-i-Imtiaz (Crescent of Excellence) Award by the President of Pakistan in 2014

References

External links 
 Ata ul Haq Qasmi's newspaper column 
 Detailed List of Daily Jang (newspaper) Columnists

1943 births
Living people
Pakistani male journalists
Pakistani columnists
Punjabi people
Pakistani people of Kashmiri descent
Ambassadors of Pakistan to Norway
Ambassadors of Pakistan to Thailand
Recipients of the Pride of Performance
Recipients of Sitara-i-Imtiaz
Recipients of Hilal-i-Imtiaz
Poets from Lahore
Pakistan Television Corporation executives
Journalists from Lahore
Urdu-language columnists
Urdu-language writers
Urdu-language dramatists and playwrights
Urdu-language poets from Pakistan
20th-century Pakistani poets